Kim Roberts is a Canadian actress, best known for her roles as Mayor Goodway in Paw Patrol, Greta on The Sinner, Christine in The Handmaids Tale, Marnie in Schitt's Creek, Neeva in The Strain, Gloria in Lucky Seven, Camilla in Being Erica, Mazz in The Doodlebops, Mrs. Arvin in I'm Not There, Deborah in Saw III and Saw IV and Mrs. Bosco in The Cheetah Girls.

Early life
Roberts' parents are from the Caribbean. Her mother, Josephine is from the Creole island of Dominica and her late father, Oswald, was born in Jamaica. They met and married in Toronto, Canada, where Roberts and her brother Mark were born. Roberts still has close ties to both islands. As a child, Roberts performed as a member of The Friendship Circle, a group of young singers and dancers directed by Lois Lilienstein of Sharon, Lois and Bram and her partner Louise. The ensemble toured locally, singing folk songs at schools and festivals like Mariposa, as well as appearing on Bram's TV show. 
Under the direction of her older cousins, Roberts began her stage career as a leading lady in home productions put on for friends and parents. She attended a drama lab at the University of Toronto at age 12, which solidified her interest in the craft. 
While enrolled in the gifted program at Earl Haig Secondary School, Roberts was given special permission to enter the acting stream at Claude Watson School for the Arts. Roberts finished her studies at C. W. Jefferys Collegiate Institute.

Career
Roberts attended the University of Western Ontario majoring in political science and minoring in philosophy, with a view to becoming a lawyer. A theater class taken at York University one summer led to an invitation from Ron Singer, the chair of the Theater department, to study at York. Roberts accepted the invitation a year later, but before completing her studies, auditioned for and was cast in the Company of Sirens touring production of, "No Problems Here." She performed as well as produced and directed for the company over the next three years. Roberts branched out into film and television and became the first woman of African descent to portray the speaking heroine in a nationally televised Canadian commercial. The spot was for Benylin cough syrup. Since then, Roberts' resume has grown to include leading and recurring roles in over 200 different on-screen credits. She has shared screen and stage with the best of the artistic community, including Christopher Plummer, Helen Mirren, Jackie Chan, Lindsay Lohan, Eugene Levy, Debbie Gibson, James Garner, Julie Andrews, Robin Williams, Alfre Woodard, Mariah Carey, Raven-Symoné,  Wesley Snipes, Tom Selleck, Farrah Fawcett and more. She has been directed and produced by many industry luminaries, of note, Steven Spielberg, Maya Angelou, Todd Haynes, Sidney Lumet, and Peter Bogdanovich.
 
Obsidian Theatre Company, Canada's premiere black theatre company, was founded in Roberts' home and she is one of thirteen founding members. Roberts narrated and performed The Book of Negroes for the Canadian Broadcasting Corporation’s  podcast ‘'Between the Covers.

While shooting In the Company of Spies'', in 1999, Roberts became one of the first actors to shoot a scene inside CIA Headquarters in Langley, Virginia.

Filmography

Awards 
Roberts received the Harold Award for theater in 1996.
She received the Reelworld Trailblazer award at the ReelWorld Film Festival in 2014 for her body of work in film and television. And in 2022 she received the Independent Leader Award at the Vaughan International Film Festival

Personal life 
Roberts was once romantically linked to jazz musician Christian McBride. She lived common law with Canadian actor Peter Bryant.

References

External links

Living people
Canadian people of Dominica descent
Canadian people of Jamaican descent
Black Canadian actresses
Canadian film actresses
Canadian television actresses
Canadian voice actresses
Actresses from Toronto
University of Western Ontario alumni
Canadian women singers
Canadian stage actresses
Year of birth missing (living people)